Ilie Cebanu (born 29 December 1986) is a Moldovan former footballer who played as goalkeeper.

Honours

Wisła Kraków (ME) 

 Młoda Ekstraklasa: 2007–08

Wisła Kraków 

 Ekstraklasa: 2007–08

Statistics 
 (correct as of 17 January 2010)

References

External links

1986 births
Living people
Footballers from Chișinău
Moldovan footballers
Moldova international footballers
Wisła Kraków players
Association football goalkeepers
Expatriate footballers in Poland
Kapfenberger SV players
Moldovan expatriates in Poland
Expatriate footballers in Russia
FC Tom Tomsk players
Russian Premier League players
FC Mordovia Saransk players
FC Zimbru Chișinău players
Moldovan Super Liga players
Ekstraklasa players
FC Rubin Kazan players
FC Volgar Astrakhan players